Reginald Murdock (born April 29, 1966) is an American politician and a Democratic member of the Arkansas Senate. Murdock previously served in the Arkansas House of Representatives from 2011 to 2023.

Political career
On April 1, 2020, Murdock became the first Arkansas state legislator to test positive for COVID-19.

Elections
2012 Redistricted to District 48, and with Republican Representative Davy Carter redistricted to District 43, Murdock was unopposed for both the May 22, 2012 Democratic Primary and the November 6, 2012 General election.
2004 When Representative John Eason left the Legislature and left the seat open, Murdock ran in the 2004 Democratic Primary, but lost to Nancy Blount, who was unopposed for the November 2, 2004 General election.
2010 When Representative Blount left the Legislature and left the seat open, Murdock won the May 18, 2010 Democratic Primary with 2,819 votes (61.8%), won the June 8 runoff election with 1,812 votes (50.4%), and was unopposed for the November 2, 2010 General election.

References

External links
Official page at the Arkansas House of Representatives

Reginald Murdock at Ballotpedia
Reginald Murdock at OpenSecrets

1966 births
Living people
African-American state legislators in Arkansas
Democratic Party members of the Arkansas House of Representatives
People from Marianna, Arkansas
University of Arkansas alumni
21st-century American politicians
21st-century African-American politicians
20th-century African-American people